is a Japanese professional baseball Infielder for the Fukuoka SoftBank Hawks of Nippon Professional Baseball.

Early baseball career
Nomura participated in the 2rd grade spring the 89th Japanese High School Baseball Invitational Tournament, as a Third baseman of the Waseda Jitsugyo High School with Kōtarō Kiyomiya. And he recorded a total of 68 home runs in his three years in high school.

Professional career
On October 25, 2018, Nomura was drafted by the Fukuoka SoftBank Hawks in the 2018 Nippon Professional Baseball draft.

On September 28, 2019, Nomura debuted in the Pacific League against the Orix Buffaloes, and he recorded his first hit. In 2019 season, Nomura played 2 games in the Pacific League.

In 2020 season, Nomura was unable to play in the Pacific League and played 74 games in the Western League with a batting average of .263 and a three home runs.

In 2021 season,he played seven games in the Pacific League.

In 2022 season, Nomura was registered first team on June 27 and recorded a hit that day against the Chiba Lotte Marines. On July 13 against the Orix Buffaloes, he recorded the game-winning RBI. On August 24, he was active against the Tohoku Rakuten Golden Eagles with three hits, a multi-hit game. While the team's main players were taken off the first team registration due to a positive test for COVID-19, Nomura, Kenta Tanigawara, and Shu Masuda, known as the Chikugo Hawks (a nickname given to the younger reserve players. Chikugo is the name of the place where the Hawks farm team is located.), supported the team's difficult situation with 20 hits and 16 runs in four games. He finished the regular season with a .229 batting average, 16 hits, and eight RBI scored in 31 games.

References

External links

 Career statistics - NPB.jp
 55 Daiju Nomura PLAYERS2022 - Fukuoka SoftBank Hawks Official site

2000 births
Living people
Fukuoka SoftBank Hawks players
Japanese baseball players
Nippon Professional Baseball infielders
Baseball people from Hyōgo Prefecture
People from Takarazuka, Hyōgo